The 2017–18 Northeastern Huskies women's basketball team represents the Northeastern University during the 2017–18 NCAA Division I women's basketball season. The Huskies, led by fourth year head coach Kelly Cole, play their home games at the Cabot Center and were members of the Colonial Athletic Association (CAA). They finished the season 16–15, 11–7 CAA play to finish in a tie for fourth place. They lost in the quarterfinals of the CAA women's tournament to Delaware. They were invited to the Women's Basketball Invitational where they lost to Yale in the first round.

Previous season
They finished the season 12–19, 8–10 CAA play to finish in sixth place. They lost in the quarterfinals of the CAA women's tournament to Drexel.

Roster

Schedule

|-
! colspan="9" style=| Non-conference regular season

|-
! colspan="9" style=| CAA regular season

|-
! colspan="9" style=| CAA Women's Tournament

|-
! colspan="9" style=| WBI

See also
2017–18 Northeastern Huskies men's basketball team

References

Northeastern Huskies women's basketball seasons
Northeastern
Northeastern